The 6th constituency of the Pas-de-Calais is a French legislative constituency in the Pas-de-Calais .

Description

The borders of Pas-de-Calais' 6th Constituency were substantial altered as a result of the 2010 redistricting of French legislative constituencies leading to the constituency losing the northern portion of Boulogne-sur-Mer to Pas-de-Calais' 5th constituency.

The constituency is notable for being the seat of former Minister of Culture Jack Lang who held the seat for ten years between 2002 and 2012.

Historic representation

Election results

2022

 
 
 
 
 
 
 
|-
| colspan="8" bgcolor="#E9E9E9"|
|-
 
 

 
 
 
 
 

* PS dissident

2021 by-election

2017

2012

 
 
 
 
 
|-
| colspan="8" bgcolor="#E9E9E9"|
|-

2007

 
 
 
 
 
 
 
 
 
|-
| colspan="8" bgcolor="#E9E9E9"|
|-

2002

 
 
 
 
 
|-
| colspan="8" bgcolor="#E9E9E9"|
|-

1997

Sources
 Official results of French elections from 1998: 

6